Andrés González Díaz (born 7 July 1955) is the Permanent Representative of Colombia to the Organization of American States since 2012. A Liberal party politician, he served as Governor of Cundinamarca on three occasions, first from 1991 to 1992 appointed by President César Gaviria Trujillo, and popularly elected twice, from 1998 to 2001, and again from 2008 to 2012. He has also served as Senator of Colombia, and Minister of Justice and Law of Colombia.

A lawyer from Externado University with graduate studies from SciencesPo, he is married to Inés Elvira Shuck Aparicio since 1997, and has three children: Manuel Andrés, Pascual, and Alejandro.

Selected works

References

External link

1955 births
Living people
People from Bogotá
Universidad Externado de Colombia alumni
20th-century Colombian lawyers
Colombian Liberal Party politicians
Ministers of Justice and Law of Colombia
Governors of Cundinamarca Department
Members of the Senate of Colombia
Permanent Representatives of Colombia to the Organization of American States